Elliot Pilkington (2 April 1890–1979) was an English footballer who played in the Football League for Oldham Athletic.

References

1890 births
1979 deaths
English footballers
Association football midfielders
English Football League players
Rossendale United F.C. players
Oldham Athletic A.F.C. players
Macclesfield Town F.C. players